Birthright is a solo album by American guitarist James Blood Ulmer recorded in 2004 and released on the Hyena label in 2005.

Reception
The Allmusic review by Thom Jurek awarded the album 4 stars, and stated, "Birthright is the album Ulmer should have made years ago. All that matters is that listeners have it now. It's a shining star in his catalog and a chillingly intimate portrait of his expansive vision and singular talent".  

Birthright was selected as the Blues Album of the Year in the 2005 Down Beat Readers' Poll.

Track listing
All compositions by James Blood Ulmer except as indicated.
 "Take My Music Back to the Church" - 4:43  
 "I Can't Take It Anymore" - 2:39  
 "Where Did All the Girls Come From" - 5:06  
 "I Ain't Superstitious" (Willie Dixon) - 3:47  
 "White Man's Jail" - 3:59  
 "High Yellow" - 3:17  
 "The Evil One" - 3:33  
 "Geechee Joe" - 4:13  
 "Love Dance Rag" - 4:08  
 "Sittin' on Top of the World" (Traditional) - 4:13  
 "My Most Favorite Thing" - 2:49  
 "Devil's Got to Burn" - 9:31
Recorded at Gigantic Studios, NYC, in 2004

Personnel
James Blood Ulmer - guitar, vocals, flute

References

Hyena Records albums
James Blood Ulmer albums
2005 albums